ChemRefer is a service that allows searching of freely available and full-text chemical and pharmaceutical literature that is published by authoritative sources.

Features include basic and advanced search options, mouseover detailed view, an integrated chemical structure drawing and search tool, downloadable toolbar, customized RSS feeds, and newsletter.

ChemRefer is primarily of use to readers who do not have subscriptions for accessing restricted chemical literature, and to publishers who offer either open access or hybrid open access journals and seek to attract further subscriptions by publicly releasing part of their archive.

See also
Google Scholar
Windows Live Academic
BASE
PubMed

References

External links

Recommendations & reviews
Cited as an "Internet Site of the Week" by the library of the Rowland Institute for Science at Harvard University
Recommended in the list of chemical literature databases by the library of the United States Naval Research Laboratory
Recommended in the list of chemical literature databases by the library of Mount Allison University
Review of ChemRefer at Depth-First chemoinformatics magazine
Recommended in the list of chemical literature databases by the Technology Research Portal, Belgium
Recommended in the list of chemical literature databases by the Centre for Research and Technology, Thessaloniki

Background
Interview with William James Griffiths at Reactive Reports chemistry magazine
Open access overview  by Professor Peter Suber, Earlham College

Scholarly search services
Chemistry literature
Information retrieval systems
Open access projects